The 2021 NAIA Division II men's basketball tournament  was due to be the tournament held by the NAIA to determine the national champion of men's college basketball among its Division I members in the United States and Canada for the 2019–20 basketball season.

Due to the unfolding COVID-19 pandemic, the tournament was cancelled by the NAIA before any games could be played. In turn, no champion was crowned.

The NAIA had pre-determined that this would be the final edition of a separate Division I tournament, planning to consolidate its two divisional tournaments back into a single event for 2021. With the cancellation of this event, the 2019 edition was the last completed edition of the tournament.

The tournament was due to be played at the Municipal Auditorium in Kansas City, Missouri.

Qualification

Bracket

See also
2020 NAIA Division II men's basketball tournament
2020 NAIA Division I women's basketball tournament
2020 NCAA Division I men's basketball tournament
2020 NCAA Division II men's basketball tournament
2020 NCAA Division III men's basketball tournament

References

NAIA
NAIA Men's Basketball Championship
2020 in sports in Missouri
NAIA Division I men's basketball tournament, 2020